Shallow and Profound is the first studio album recorded by Yonderboi. It was released in 2000.

Track listing

Contributors
Benski - words (track 1)
Bootsie - scratch (track 1, 5, 7, 11, 15)
Edina Kutzora - vocals (track 2, 3, 8, 14)
Dániel Váczi - saxophones (track 2, 3, 5)
Árpád Vajdovich - bass (track 2, 3, 6, 7, 13)
Dr. Zsombor Zrubka - vibraphone (track 8, 15)
David Yengibarian - accordion (track 4, 6)
Balázs Zságer - keyboards (track 2, 3, 7, 13, 14, 16), fender rhodes (track 8, 12, 16), comb (track 7)
Andor Kovács - guitar (track 3, 9, 10, 13)
Zoltán Tombor - cover photo

References

External links
 Shallow And Profound at Allmusic webpage

2000 debut albums
Yonderboi albums